Alessio Giustini (born 27 July 1991 in Sora) is an Italian footballer who plays as a midfielder for Giulianova on loan from Pescara.

References

External links
 

1991 births
Living people
Sportspeople from the Province of Frosinone
Italian footballers
Association football midfielders
Delfino Pescara 1936 players
Giulianova Calcio players
Footballers from Lazio